Cwmllynfell is the name of a village, community and electoral ward in Neath Port Talbot county borough, Wales.

Amenities 
Cwmllynfell has its own local rugby union team - Cwmllynfell RFC. Also, a bilingual primary school, supermarket, post office, village hall, church and chapels. Nearby there is the Black Mountain which supplies views to the village.

Electoral ward 
The electoral ward consists of some or all of the following areas: Blaen-nant, Bryn-Melyn, Celliwarog, Cwmllynfell, Rhiw-fawr in the parliamentary constituency of Neath.  Cwmllynfell is bounded by the wards of Quarter Bach of Carmarthenshire to the northeast; Cwmtwrch of Powys to the east; Ystalyfera to the southeast; Pontardawe to the southwest; Gwaun-Cae-Gurwen to the west and Lower Brynamman to the northwest.

In the 2017 local council elections the results were:

In the 2012 local council elections the turn out was 49.78%.  The results were:

Earthquake
At 14:31 on 17 February 2018 the village was the epicentre of a 4.6 magnitude earthquake, the largest in the British Isles since 2008. The quake was felt as far away as Blackpool.

References

External links
Cwmllynfell RFC
www.geograph.co.uk : photos of Cwmllynfell and surrounding area

Electoral wards of Neath Port Talbot
Communities in Neath Port Talbot
Villages in Neath Port Talbot